Ajhai railway station is on the Agra–Delhi chord. It is located in Mathura district in the Indian state of Uttar Pradesh. It serves the nearby city of Chaumuhan and nearby villages.

Electrification 
The Faridabad – Mathura Agra section was electrified in 1982–1985.

References 

Agra railway division
Railway stations in Mathura district